This is a list of composers who are Filipino.

A
Rosalina Abejo (1922-1991)
Nicanor Abelardo (1893-1934)
Marcelo Adonay (1848–1928)
Joey Albert (born 1960)
Nilo Alcala (born 1978)
Ogie Alcasid (born 1967)
Johnny Alegre (born 1955)
Barbie Almalbis (born 1977)
Nora Aunor (born 1953)

B
Jonas Baes (born 1961)
Ely Buendia (born 1970)
Rico Blanco (born 1973)
 Ladislao Bonus (1854-1908)
 Luis Borromeo (c. 1800/1900)
 Antonino Buenaventura (1904-1996)

C
 Manuel Kabajar Cabase (1921-2003)
Lito Camo (born 1972)
George Canseco (1934-2004)
Ryan Cayabyab (born 1954)
Levi Celerio (1910-2002)
 Josefino Cenizal (1916-2015)
 Jose Mari Chan (born 1945)
 Jeffrey Ching (born 1965)
 Yeng Constantino (born 1988)
 Teddy Corpuz (born 1978)
 Sheryl Cruz (born 1974)
 Ernani Cuenco (1936-1988)

D
 Michael Dadap (born 1935)
 Vincent de Jesus (born 1968)
 Diwa de Leon (born 1980)
 Felipe Padilla de León (1912-1992)
 Epifanio de los Santos (1871-1928)
 Moira Dela Torre (born 1993)
 Romeo Diaz
 Jay Durias (born 1975)

E
 Fred Elizalde (1907-1979)

F
 Jaime Fabregas (born 1950)
 Tats Faustino
 Francisco Feliciano (1941-2014)
Julián Felipe (1861-1944)

G
 Alice Doria-Gamilla (born 1931)
 Jude Gitamondoc
 Gary Granada (born 1960)

H
 Mike Hanopol (born 1946)

J
 Ramon Jacinto (born 1945)
 Danny Javier
Jaya (born 1970)
 RJ Jimenez (born 1983)
 Jugs Jugueta (born 1979)

K
 Lucrecia Roces Kasilag (1918-2008)

M
 José Maceda (1917-2004)
 Bamboo Mañalac (born 1976) 
 Raul Mitra
Chito Miranda (born 1976)
 Antonio Molina (1894-1980)

N
 Kitchie Nadal (born 1980)
 Julio Nakpil (1867-1960)
Joy Nilo (born 1970)

O
 Amada Santos Ocampo (1925-2009)
 Louie Ocampo (born 1960)
 Onecimo Oclarit (born 1951)

P
 Dolores Paterno (1854-1881)
 Rico J. Puno (1953-2018)

R
Jay R (born 1982)
Snaffu Rigor (1946-2016)
 Reev Robledo

S
 Lea Salonga (born 1971)
 Gerard Salonga (born 1973)
Lucio D. San Pedro (1913-2002)
Francisco Santiago (1889-1947)
 Jesús Manuel Santiago
 Ramon Santos (born 1941)
 Vehnee Saturno (born 1954)
 Aiza Seguerra (born 1983)
 Pepe Smith (1947-2014)
 Tito Sotto (born 1948)

T
 Jerrold Tarog (born 1977)

V
 Gary Valenciano (born 1964)
Rey Valera (born 1954)
Yoyoy Villame (1932-2007)
Emilio Villareal (1920-2011)

Z
 Ben Zubiri (1911-1969)

Filipino
Composers